Fellows of the Royal Society elected in 1999.

Fellows

Frances Mary Ashcroft, geneticist
Anthony Gerard Martin Barrett, chemist
Rosa Susan Penelope Beddington (1956–2001), biologist
Derek Ernest Gilmor Briggs, Irish palaeontologist and taphonomist 
Simon Fraser Campbell, chemist
Ian Stuart Edward Carmichael  (1930–2011), igneous petrologist and volcanologist 
Lorna Casselton, biologist
John Brian Clegg, molecular biologist
David John Hugh Cockayne  (1942–2010), materials scientist
David Thomas Delpy, bioengineer
Derek Ashworth Denton, Australian biochemist
Raymond Alan Dixon, microbiologist
Athene Donald, physicist
Philip Christopher England, geophysicist
Douglas Thomas Fearon, medical immunologist
Gary William Gibbons, theoretical physicist
William Timothy Gowers, mathematician
Ronald Ernest Grigg, chemist
Alan Hall (1952–2015), cell biologist
Sir Peter Leonard Knight, physicist
John Paul Maier, chemist
Barry James Marshall, Australian physician
Iain William Mattaj, molecular biologist
Ernest A McCulloch  (1926–2011), cell biologist
John Graham McWhirter, mathematician
John Dixon Mollon, neuroscientist
John Richard Ockendon, applied mathematician
John Bernard Pethica, material scientist
Dolph Schluter, Canadian evolutionary biologist
John Graham Shepherd, earth scientist
Joseph Ivor Silk, astrophysicist
William James Stirling, particle physicist
Alfred Geoffrey Sykes  (1934–2007), inorganic chemist
Janet M Thornton, biochemist
John Francis Toland, mathematical scientist
Anthony James Trewavas, molecular biologist
Alan Walker, paleoanthropologist
Graham Barry Warren, biochemist
Dennis Lawrence Weaire, Irish physicist
Sir Peter Michael Williams, physicist
Robert Williamson, Australian molecular geneticist
Sir Magdi Habib Yacoub, cardiothoracic surgeon

Foreign members

Robert Huber, German biochemist
Marc W Kirschner, American cell biologist
George Ledyard Stebbins  (1906–2000), American geneticist
Gilbert Stork, American organic chemist
Edward Witten, American theoretical physicist
Richard Neil Zare, American physical chemist

References

1999
1999 in science
1999 in the United Kingdom